Lawrence Arthur Colley Panton  or as he was known in his professional life L. A. C. Panton (18941954) was a Canadian painter and educator.

Career 
Panton was born at Egremont, Cheshire, in England, and emigrated to Canada at 17 years of age. He enlisted in Army in the First World War, serving in the 4th Division, Signal Company (1916–1919). After he returned from the war, he studied art at the Ontario College of Art in the evening. He also took classes at the Central Technical School in Toronto, then worked at Rous and Mann as a designer until 1924 when he got a job teaching art. He taught first at the Central Technical School, then at Western Technical School (1926–1937), and then as art director at Northern Vocational School (1937–1951) from which he took sabbatical leave to study with William C. Palmer (1950). Finally he became principal of the Ontario College of Art (1951–1954).

Work 
He was influenced by the Group of Seven in his painting at first, but his work became changed to become a synthesis of the natural world and abstraction. His retrospective in 1990 was appropriately titled Towards a lyrical abstraction.

Exhibitions 
Panton's work was shown in many exhibitions abroad such as the British Empire Exhibition, Wembley (1924); A Century of Canadian Art at the Tate Gallery (1938) and others. Over the years he held solo shows at Laing Galleries (1949) and elsewhere. A memorial exhibition of his work was shown by the Ontario Society of Artists at the Art Gallery of Toronto (1955) and a retrospective show was held at Hart House, University of Toronto (1974), as well as a show of his work by the Park Gallery, Toronto and in 1990, the Art Gallery of Ontario circulated a retrospective titled Towards a lyrical abstraction: the art of L.A.C. Panton, curated by Christine Boyanoski.

Memberships 
Panton was active in many organizations, including the Ontario Society of Artists (member in 1925, President 1931–1937), the Canadian Society of Painters in Water Colour (CSPWC/SCPA) which he helped found in 1925, the Canadian Society of Painter-Etchers and Engravers, the Canadian Society of Graphic Art, the Canadian Group of Painters, the Royal Canadian Academy of Arts (full member 1943), the Federation of Canadian Artists (1942, Chairman, Ontario Division, 1945), and the Arts and Letters Club (President 1953–1954). He also worked with the Fine Arts Committee of the Canadian National Exhibition and the National Industrial Design Committee.

Selected public collections 
His work is found in such public collections as the Art Gallery of Ontario, Toronto; Museum London, Ontario; the National Gallery of Canada, Ottawa; the Winnipeg Art Gallery, Manitoba; and the National Gallery of Australia.

The L.A.C. Panton Fonds CA OTAG SC046 is in the Art Gallery of Ontario.

Personal life 
In 1920 he married Marion Pye; their son Charles was born in 1921 and died in action in 1944.

References

Further reading 
 

1894 births
1954 deaths
19th-century Canadian painters
Canadian male painters
20th-century Canadian painters
Canadian watercolourists
English emigrants to Canada
People from Cheshire
Members of the Royal Canadian Academy of Arts
19th-century Canadian male artists
20th-century Canadian male artists
Canadian educators
Academic staff of OCAD University
Canadian academic administrators
OCAD University administrators